Glennie Yates Jr. (September 7, 1927 – January 26, 2022) was an American politician and architect.

Yates was born in Walnut Ridge, Arkansas. He moved with his family to Virginia Beach, Virginia during World War II. He served in the United States Merchant Marines for two years. Yates then went to University of Virginia, University of Pennsylvania, and Pratt Institute. Yates served in the Virginia House of Delegates from 1966 until 1972. Yates lived in Portsmouth, Virginia, with his wife and family and was an architect.

References

1927 births
2022 deaths
People from Walnut Ridge, Arkansas
Politicians from Portsmouth, Virginia
People from Virginia Beach, Virginia
United States Merchant Mariners
Architects from Virginia
Pratt Institute alumni
University of Pennsylvania alumni
University of Virginia alumni
Members of the Virginia House of Delegates